Paramenesia kasugensis is a species of beetle in the family Cerambycidae. It was described by Seki and Kobayashi in 1935. It is known from Japan.

References

Saperdini
Beetles described in 1935